Székely is a Hungarian language surname. The word "Székely" refers to Hungarian people from the historical region of Transylvania, Romania. 

The related surnames, resulted from various transliterations and translations, are Szekely, Sekely, Sekelj, Szekler, Sekler, Secui.

It may refer to:

András Székely, a Hungarian swimmer
Árpád Székely, the Ambassador Extraordinary and Plenipotentiary of the Republic of Hungary to the Russian Federation 
Béla Székely, (17 July 1889 – 10 January 1939) was a Hungarian politician
Bertalan Székely, a Hungarian Romantic painter
Bulcsú Székely, a Hungarian water polo player
Deborah Szekely (born Shainman), an American philanthropist active in mind/body wellness, founder of the spa-fitness movement
Edmund Bordeaux Szekely, a Hungarian linguist, philosopher, and naturopath
Éva Székely (1927–2020), a Hungarian swimmer
Ferenc Székely  (11 March 1842 – 17 March 1921) was a Hungarian politician
Gábor J. Székely, a Hungarian-American statistician and mathematician 
György (Székely) Dózsa
Györgyi Marvalics-Székely, a Hungarian Olympic fencer
János Székely, a Romanian footballer
Júlia Székely (8 May 1906 – 19 March 1986) was a Hungarian writer and musician
Louis C.K. (born Louis Székely), American comedian
Mihály Székely May 8, 1901; died Budapest, March 22, 1963) was a Hungarian bass singer  
Mózes Székely, a ruler of Transylvania 
Péter Székely, a Hungarian chess Grandmaster 
Szabolcs Székely, a Romanian football player
Violeta Szekely, a Romanian middle-distance runner
Vladimír Székely, a Hungarian physicist
Zoltán Székely, a Hungarian violinist

Variations
Steve Sekely, (born István Székely), film director
Les Sekely, an American radio talk show host 
Tibor Sekelj (born Tibor Székely), explorer
Matjaž Sekelj, Slovenian hockey player and coach

Szekely